Stevie Hunter is a fictional character appearing in American comic books published by Marvel Comics. Her first appearance was in The Uncanny X-Men #139 as a surprise dance teacher for the newest X-Man/Student, Kitty Pryde, a.k.a. Shadowcat. She has continued to make some scattered appearance in X-Men comic books.

Fictional character biography
Stevie Hunter was a professional dancer, but an injury to her knee ruined her career and forced her to discontinue her dancing full-time. As an alternative, she began teaching dance classes at a studio in Salem Center, her most notable student being Kitty Pryde. Stevie quickly became a best friend to Kitty, and on occasions made Storm, who had unofficially taken up the mantle of Kitty's surrogate mother, slightly jealous of the attention that Kitty gave to Stevie.

At one point, Stevie and Storm attended a ballet performance at the Metropolitan Opera House, where Stevie was captured and taken hostage by Arcade's assistant Miss Locke and later rescued by the X-Men. Upon this incident, Stevie learned about the true identities of Kitty, Ororo and their friends, and became an ally of the X-Men and privy to their secrets. She later began physical education classes with the rookie New Mutants, focusing on ballet. She would continue these sessions over the years.

Stevie has tried to stay out of the fights the mutants get in, but has become involved in a few nevertheless. In one case, she and the New Mutants were involved in a fight against the demon S'ym, who attacks them inside the X-Mansion. In trying to get a rattled Magik away from the fight, she ends up face to face with the demon. Her life was saved only by the magical might of Illyana herself, turning the demon's loyalties. Even then S'ym offered to kill Stevie for knowing too much.

In a later incident, Stevie was present when forces from Genosha attacked the X-Mansion. She made it through a trapdoor to safety below, but unfortunately Storm, Warlock, Rictor, Boom-Boom and Wolfsbane, one of her original students, were kidnapped. Stevie did not go on the rescue mission.

In one of her last major appearances, the Shadow King had taken over the mind of Peter Rasputin, Illyana's brother. Stevie helps Professor X stay one step ahead of Peter, until they can get to the mansion's Danger Room. This allows them to subdue Peter without harming him.

In X-Men Gold, Stevie Hunter reappears as a Congresswoman attempting to assist Kitty's X-Men in presenting the mutant case during a governmental proposition for an unjust Mutant Deportation Act.

References

External links
 
Uncanny Xmen.net Database

Characters created by Chris Claremont
Comics characters introduced in 1980
Characters created by John Byrne (comics)
Fictional African-American people
Fictional dancers
Fictional schoolteachers
Marvel Comics female characters
X-Men supporting characters